The Mexican pronghorn (Antilocapra americana mexicana) is a pronghorn native to Mexico. It was found in the United States (in Arizona), but is considered extirpated there.

Reintroduction
With the Mexican pronghorn being an endangered species due to habitat destruction, overgrazing, poaching, and fencing of ranches, efforts have been made to reintroduce them into Mexico. Human intervention may be necessary, such as growing seedlings and transplants of the flora the animals survive on. In Coahuila, it was determined the animals browse mainly on forbs. Further things that can be done to help the reintroduction of this subspecies include setting up clean, reliable water stations  (which serve to benefit all area wildlife), reducing the amount of grazing by livestock, and minimizing fence use. Temporary bans on hunting/killing pronghorn will be necessary, until populations stabilize sufficiently.

Conservation
After reintroduction of the Mexican pronghorn, the next step is to start the conservation process. Historically, poaching was one of the factors that led them to become endangered. Only when the population is self-sustaining and thriving, can establishment of a hunting season (by permit) be considered for practical conservation. Unfortunately pronghorn numbers aren’t anywhere near, for example, those of white-tailed deer or mule deer, so this concept is still rather in its infancy. Once sustainable herds are re-established, management plans can be implemented by the states where the animals are found. This allows a “survival-of-the-fittest” approach to aid in the population’s genetic variability, as well as money going to the state. Other ways are contributing money and service to conservation organizations like the National Wildlife Federation.

References

Mammals of Mexico
Mammals of North America
Pronghorns